REV Media Group (formerly known as REV Asia Holdings) was formed on 8 October 2013 following the completion of the merger between certain Catcha Media Berhad (Catcha Media) subsidiaries and Says Sdn Bhd. The merger deal, valued at MYR60 million was first announced in May 2013  and completed in July. The new company that resulted was named Rev Asia Holdings Sdn Bhd or Rev Asia for short. On May 8, 2017, Rev Asia Sdn Bhd's subsidiary, Rev Asia Holdings, was acquired by Media Prima for MYR105 million.

Founders
Rev Asia's board of director includes Khailee Ng (co-founded GroupsMore, a leading group buying company acquired by Groupon in 2011, and SAYS.com, a regional social media advertising and news network) as its chairman, and entrepreneur Patrick Grove (Group CEO of Malaysia-based investment group Catcha Group) and Joel Neoh Eu-Jin (SAYS.com co-founder and Head of Asia Pacific for Groupon) on its board of directors.

History 
On May 8, 2017, Media Prima Bhd, Malaysia's largest integrated media group, announced the landmark acquisition of 100 per cent equity interest in REV Asia Holdings Sdn Bhd, a subsidiary of Rev Asia Bhd and one of Southeast Asia's leading digital media groups for RM105 million. Digital assets under Rev Asia Holdings acquired by Media Prima include Malay, English and Chinese-language portals such as OHBULAN!, SAYS, Viral Cham, Rojaklah, JUICE, 8Share, MyResipi, KongsiResipi.com and SirapLimau.

Future 
On September 1, 2020, Rev Asia Bhd announced through Bursa that it would be acquiring iMedia Asia Sdn Bhd — a digital media company that focuses on content and technology, and social influencer marketing, subject to approval. iMedia owns and represents some digital properties which have a combined reach of over 8 million Malaysians monthly.  iMedia clients include some of the largest tech companies in the region such as Shopee (SEA Group), iQiyi (Baidu), Foodpanda, Huawei and top global brands such as McDonald's, L'Oréal, Fonterra and Mercedes.

References

External links 

2013 establishments in Malaysia
Digital media
Companies listed on ACE Market
Mass media companies established in 2013
Mass media companies of Malaysia
Malaysian companies established in 2013
Media Prima